Michael Crawford, better known as Magnedo7, is an American Music Producer from North Carolina. He has worked with many artists including Jim Jones, Obie Trice, 50 Cent, Eminem and Ice Cube. Michael's first break in the Music industry came with his production; Blow the Bank, on Jim Jones' album Pray IV Reign. Michael holds a bachelor's degree in Arts and Science from North Carolina Agricultural and Technical State University.

Early life 
Michael Crawford was born on November 7, 1983 in Winston-Salem, North Carolina, the son of Cynthia, who owns a local beauty salon. In the sixth grade he started playing piano for different churches locally, and also began recording music on a four-track TASCAM cassette recorder he purchased with money he made from playing piano on the weekends. He started an ensemble with a childhood friend called the Voices of Victory, which later became Chosen for Praise. His musical influences includes Prince, Parliament Funkadelic, and Busta Rhymes. Later in his career he learned to sample music from musicians of this time period. He would play songs that he heard, practicing until he mastered them.

In 1999 while in high school, Crawford met with music producer Ski Beatz who encouraged him in his work.

While attending college at North Carolina Agricultural and Technical State University, Crawford started producing beats in his dormitory room and started a hip hop group called The Internationalz which opened the door for him to release music independently.  While in the hip hop group Magnedo7 started performing as a rapping keyboard player, as the group performed shows up and down the East coast. Crawford worked as a management trainee at Enterprise Rent-A-Car, where he played the group's album, and sold copies while driving customers. He interned at Hidden Beach Recordings as a Street Team Representative. Throughout 2003 through emailing record labels and music managers, and sending CDs weekly, he landed a management deal. This deal led to his first major label placement on the Jim Jones album Pray IV Reign.

Elleisinc Music Group 
In 2007, Magnedo7 started his production and publishing company called Elleisinc Music Group. Since the start of the company, music has been released on Shady/Aftermath Records, Interscope, Sony, Universal Music Group, Grand Hustle, G-unit, and also licensed on ESPN. EIMG, the label has also released music from ABC networks Rising Star contestant Shameia Crawford and has produced music for Miss Hawaii Candes Meijide Gentry and several independent artists from North Caroline, Georgia, Louisiana & Michigan.

Discography

Solo albums
 2013: Memoirs of an Architect'
 2014: Luvmesumu Collaborative albums 
 2007: International Feel (The Internationalz)
 2008: Internationalz Live (The Internationalz)
 2011: Christmas 365 (Shameia Crawford)]
 2012: Love Game (Candes Meijide Gentry)]
 2013: Shop This EP (Shameia Crawford)]
 2015: Birthright (Shameia Crawford)]
 2015: Napoleon Syndrome EP (Quay Millinez)

 Other Production 
 2008: Present A Tribute to Bad Santa Starring Mike Epps (Jim Jones and Skull Gang)
 2009: Pray IV Reign (Jim Jones) 
 2009: Delicious Japanese (Teriyaki Boyz)
 2010: Recovery (Eminem) 
 2011: Welcome to Hell (Bad Meets Evil)
 2012: Fly Therapy (Yung Booke)
 2012: 5 Murder by Numbers (50 Cent)
 2013: City on my Back (Yung Booke)]
 2013: Sasquatch (Ice Cube)
 2013: Y.O.U. (Tito Lopez)
 2014: Bloodclaute Song (Future Fambo)
 2015: The Hangover (Obie Trice)
 2016: Ass (Obie Trice)
 2017: Magnedo7 Bittersweet
 2018: Magnedo7 Taskmaster Vol.1
 2018: Mother My Next Guy Amina Buddafly
 2018: (Everythang's Corrupt) Streets Shed Tears, One for the Money (Ice Cube)
 2019: The Fifth (Obie Trice)
 2019: This Life (Shameia Crawford)
 2019: Here With You (Shameia Crawford)

 Awards and nominations 

!
|-
|align=center|2010
|Recovery''
|Grammy Award for Album of the Year
|
|

References

External links
 
 

1983 births
Living people
American hip hop record producers